Beckett is an unincorporated community in Washington County, in the U.S. state of Ohio.

History
A post office called Becketts was established in 1888, the name was shortened to Beckett in 1893, and the post office closed in 1936. A variant name was Beckett's Station.

References

Unincorporated communities in Washington County, Ohio
Unincorporated communities in Ohio